Ream may refer to:

 Paper ream, unit of 500 sheets of paper
 Ream (surname)
 Reamer, tool used to widen a hole
 Ream, West Virginia
 Ream, the name of Rama in the Khmer version of the Ramayana, the Reamker
 Ream National Park, a national park in Cambodia
 Ream Naval Base, Sihanoukville, Cambodia

See also
Reem (disambiguation)
Reamer (disambiguation)